Doubravka is a female given name of Slavic origin. It derives from the Slavic word doubrava meaning oak grove and is pronounced dow-brahf-kah in Czech.

Nicknames 
 Czech: Doubra, Doubravuše, Doubruše, Duběnka, Doubí (dow-bee), Duba, Doubinka, Dubi, Dobra

Name Days 
 Czech: 19 January

Other variants 
 Доубравка: Bulgarian
 Dubravka: Bosnian, Croatian
 Dúbravka: Slovak
 Dąbrówka: Polish (pronounced: dam-bruf-kah)
 Дубравка: Serbian, Russian

Famous bearers 
 Doubravka Přemyslovna, Bohemian princess, member of the Přemyslid dynasty and by marriage Duchess of the Polans
 Doubravka Svobodová, Czech director of Divadlo Na zábradlí (from 1993)
 Mgr. Doubravka Olšáková, Czech historian

Fictional Doubravka’s 
 Psychologist Doubravka, a character from Czech film comedy Léto s kovbojem (The Summer with Cowboy)

Czech feminine given names
Slavic feminine given names